Bob Thomas was an Irish association footballer during the 1920s and 1930s.

Thomas was a left half during this era in the League of Ireland and was part of the All-Conquering Bohemians team of 1927–28 who won every trophy on offer that season - League of Ireland, FAI Cup, Shield and Leinster Senior Cup.
After this success, Thomas left the then strictly amateur Bohs to join rivals Shelbourne on professional terms.

He later had a spell as manager of Shelbourne. His nephew is Theo Dunne who won the FAI Cup with Shels in 1960.

Honours

As a player

League of Ireland
 Bohemians - 1927/28
FAI Cup
 Bohemians - 1928
League of Ireland Shield
 Bohemians - 1928

As a manager

League of Ireland
 Shelbourne F.C. - 1952/53

References

Republic of Ireland association footballers
Republic of Ireland football managers
League of Ireland players
League of Ireland managers
Bohemian F.C. players
Shelbourne F.C. players
Shelbourne F.C. managers
Association footballers not categorized by position
Year of birth missing